Mouhamed Alga Ndiaye (born 16 February 1999) is a Senegalese professional basketball player for Ryerson Rams and the Senegalese national team.

College career
Ndiaye committed to Ryerson Rams in Canada in 2019. In his rookie year, he averaged 9.9 points and 3.3 rebounds in 17 games.

National team career
Ndiaye represented Senegal at the FIBA AfroBasket 2021, where the team won the bronze medal.

References

External links
Mouhamed Ndiaye at USbasket.com

1999 births
Living people
Senegalese expatriate basketball people in Canada
Senegalese men's basketball players
Shooting guards